Thomas "Tommy" Thompson (birth unknown – death unknown), also known by the nickname of "Tubby", was an English professional rugby league footballer who played in the 1920s and 1930s.

Playing career

International honours
Tommy Thompson won a cap for England while at Warrington in 1933 against Australia.

Challenge Cup Final appearances
Tommy Thompson played , i.e. number 5, in Warrington's 17-21 defeat by Huddersfield in the 1932-33 Challenge Cup Final at Wembley Stadium, London on Saturday 6 May 1933.

County Cup Final appearances
Tommy Thompson played in Warrington's 15-2 victory over Salford in the 1929 Lancashire County Cup Final during the 1929–30 season at Central Park, Wigan on Saturday 23 November 1929, and played, and scored a try in the 10-9 victory over St. Helens in the 1932 Lancashire County Cup Final during the 1932–33 season at Central Park, Wigan on Saturday 19 November 1932.

Notable tour matches
Tommy Thompson played, and scored all 17-points with 3-tries, and 4-goals in Warrington's 17-8 victory over Australia on the 1929–30 Kangaroo tour of Great Britain at Wilderspool Stadium, Warrington on Saturday 21 December 1929.

Club career
Tommy Thompson made his  début for Warrington in the 7-39 defeat by Wakefield Trinity at Belle Vue, Wakefield on Saturday 1 October 1927, in the 1930-31 season he equalled Warrington's "Most Tries In A Season" record with 28-tries, subsequently extended by Steve Ray to 33-tries, and then by Brian Bevan to 48, 57, 60, and finally 66-tries, in the 1932-33 season he set Warrington's "Most Tries In A Game" record with 6-tries despite being carried off injured against Bradford Northern on Thursday 6 April 1933, subsequently extended by Brian Bevan to 7-tries, he played his last match for Warrington in the 3-10 defeat by Widnes at Wilderspool Stadium, Warrington on Saturday 30 March 1934, and he made his début for Oldham, and scored a try, in the 7-7 draw with Warrington.

Honoured at Warrington Wolves
Tommy 'Tubby' Thompson is a Warrington Wolves Hall of Fame inductee.

References

External links
Statistics at orl-heritagetrust.org.uk
Statistics at wolvesplayers.thisiswarrington.co.uk

England national rugby league team players
English rugby league players
Leigh Leopards captains
Leigh Leopards players
Oldham R.L.F.C. players
Place of birth missing
Place of death missing
Rugby league centres
Rugby league wingers
Warrington Wolves players
Year of birth missing
Year of death missing